In mathematics, the Babenko–Beckner inequality (after K. Ivan Babenko and William E. Beckner) is a sharpened form of the Hausdorff–Young inequality having applications to uncertainty principles in the Fourier analysis of Lp spaces.  The (q, p)-norm of the n-dimensional Fourier transform is defined to be

In 1961, Babenko found this norm for even integer values of q.  Finally, in 1975, using Hermite functions as eigenfunctions of the Fourier transform, Beckner proved that the value of this norm for all  is

Thus we have the Babenko–Beckner inequality that

To write this out explicitly, (in the case of one dimension,) if the Fourier transform is normalized so that

then we have

or more simply

Main ideas of proof
Throughout this sketch of a proof, let

(Except for q, we will more or less follow the notation of Beckner.)

The two-point lemma
Let  be the discrete measure with weight  at the points  Then the operator

or more explicitly,

for any complex a, b.  (See Beckner's paper for the proof of his "two-point lemma".)

A sequence of Bernoulli trials
The measure  that was introduced above is actually a fair Bernoulli trial with mean 0 and variance 1. Consider the sum of a sequence of n such Bernoulli trials, independent and normalized so that the standard deviation remains 1.

Convergence to standard normal distribution
The sequence  converges weakly to the standard normal probability distribution  with respect to functions of polynomial growth.  In the limit, the extension of the operator C above in terms of the elementary symmetric polynomials with respect to the measure  is expressed as an operator T in terms of the Hermite polynomials with respect to the standard normal distribution.  These Hermite functions are the eigenfunctions of the Fourier transform, and the (q, p)-norm of the Fourier transform is obtained as a result after some renormalization.

See also
Entropic uncertainty

References

Inequalities